St John's is a small village in the sheading of Glenfaba in the Isle of Man, in the island's central valley. It is in the House of Keys constituency of Glenfaba & Peel, which elects two MHKs.

Tynwald Day
Tynwald Hill, the original assembly place for the Isle of Man parliament, Tynwald, is the scene of the annual ceremony in which the laws of the Isle of Man are promulgated in English and Manx, usually on July 5. Tynwald Day attracts thousands of spectators to watch the ceremony and participate in the Tynwald Fair.

Tynwald Day, July 5, corresponded to St John's feast day by the Julian calendar, which was the date held to be midsummer day; so Tynwald Day was a midsummer fair.

The Anglican church in the village is dedicated to St John and the village takes its name from the church. Within the church are reserved seats with name plaques for members of both branches of the Manx parliament, whilst in the adjacent church hall is an exhibition detailing the history of Tynwald.

Other features of the village
The Tynwald National Park (also known as the Arboretum) is situated on the east side of the village.

Opposite the church is the site of the ancient pound where stray animals were placed until claimed. If unclaimed after a year and a day they became the property of the Lord of Mann, whilst the recovery fee for reclaimed animals was shared equally between the Lord of Mann and the pound official, the "pindar". Also displayed on that site are large stones from a 2300 BC burial chamber found locally.

The main commercial venture of the village is Tynwald Mills, which claims to be the only department store in the island.

Road transport
The village is on the A1 Douglas to Peel road. It is also close to the junction with the A3, which leads in a southerly direction to Foxdale and Castletown, and northerly to Kirk Michael, Ballaugh, Sulby and Ramsey. It is thus conveniently located for access from all parts of the island (even before these roads were built), which is believed to have been a consideration in the original location of Tynwald here.

Former railway station
The village's railway station has long since closed. In its day it was a major railway junction, in the context of the Isle of Man: it was on the Isle of Man Railway (Peel line), the Manx Northern Railway and the Foxdale Railway. The trackbed of the Isle of Man Railway is now used as a footpath, named the Steam Heritage Trail.

Primary school

External links
 
 Information about St John's

References

Saint John's, Isle of Man